Lando Conti (1 November 1933 – 10 February 1986) was an Italian politician and past Mayor of Florence, Italy, who was assassinated by the terrorist group the Red Brigades.

Biography
Conti was the mayor of Florence from 26 March 1984 until 26 September 1985. He was a member of the Italian Republican Party.

On 10 February 1986 he was shot dead by the Red Brigades. He was killed in the hills outside the city. The Red Brigades had not claimed responsibility for a political murder since 27 March 1985.

Conti is buried at the Cimitero di Trespiano. In 2000 his family tomb at the historic cemetery was vandalized.

References

1986 deaths
Mayors of Florence
1933 births